Rowland Huw Prichard (alt Rowland Hugh Pritchard) (14 January 1811 – 25 January 1887) was a Welsh musician.  A native of Graienyn, near Bala, he lived most of his life in the area, serving for a time as a loom tender's assistant in Holywell, where he died.  In 1844 Prichard published Cyfaill y Cantorion (The Singer's Friend), a song book intended for children.

Prichard is remembered today as the composer of the hymn tune "Hyfrydol", to which the hymn "Alleluia! Sing to Jesus", with words by William Chatterton Dix is generally sung.

He is buried at Saint Peters Church, Holywell, Flintshire.

Hymns
 Come, Thou Long Expected Jesus
 Ye that know the Lord is gracious

See also
 Cyril Alington

References

External links
Biography at the Cyber Hymnal

1811 births
1887 deaths
Welsh composers
Welsh male composers
19th-century British composers
19th-century British male musicians